Olga Romanovna Mikutina (born 6 October 2003) is a Ukrainian-Austrian figure skater who competes for Austria. She is a two-time Austrian national champion (2020–2021), as well as a two-time Austrian national junior champion (2019–2020). Internationally, she has represented the country at the European and World championships.

Career

Early life and career 
Mikutina was born on 6 October 2003 in Kharkiv, Ukraine. Her father, Roman, is a hockey player. She took up skating in 2007 at the age of four. She began her skating career competing for her native Ukraine and, by age 12, was already a three-time Ukrainian youth national champion. 

When she was 12, her parents decided that she needed better training conditions than were available in Ukraine and were advised to seek out coach Elena Romanova in Feldkirch, Austria. She would later remark, "at first, I didn’t realize that we were really moving there. I thought we were just training there for some time." She began competing for Austria at the advanced novice level internationally in 2016. She subsequently became an Austrian citizen in January 2020.

2017–2018 season
At the 2018 Austrian Championships, Mikutina won the junior bronze medal.

2018–2019 season
Mikutina made her ISU Junior Grand Prix debut in August 2019 at the 2018 JGP Austria. She placed thirteenth overall at the event. Later in the season, she improved her JGP record by placing ninth overall at her second assignment, the 2018 JGP Czech Republic. After the Junior Grand Prix, Mikutina competed at several other international competitions, taking gold in the junior divisions of the 2018 installments of the Halloween Cup, Skate Celje, and the Volvo Open Cup.

At the 2019 Austrian Championships in December, Mikutina won her first junior national title and was thus named to the Austrian team for the 2019 World Junior Championships in Zagreb, Croatia. At the event in March, Mikutina ranked twentieth in the short program and qualified for the free skate, where she placed fifteenth, which lifted her to eighteenth overall.

2019–2020 season
Mikutina started the season at the 2019 JGP Latvia, where she placed seventeenth. Later that month, she placed thirteenth at 2019 JGP Zagreb. At her next event, Mikutina finished fourth at Ice Star 2019, held in Minsk. Afterward, she completed at several international competitions on the senior level, earning the silver medal at Golden Bear, bronze at the Tallinn Trophy, and gold medals at Icelab International Cup, Eiscup Innsbruck and  Bosphorus Cup. In December, she won gold on the junior and senior levels at the Austrian championships, becoming the first skater to simultaneously hold Austrian national junior and senior titles. 

In January, Mikutina came in fourth place at the EduSport Trophy in Bucharest and was assigned to the 2020 European Championships held in Graz, Austria. She ranked twenty-first in the short program at the event, earning a new personal best of 53.19 points. After the free skate, she finished in twenty-fourth place overall. Mikutina finished her season at the Jégvirág Cup in Hungary, where she won the gold medal at the junior level. She had been assigned to compete at the World Championships in Montreal, which would have been her senior Worlds debut, but those were cancelled as a result of the coronavirus pandemic.

2020–2021 season
Mikutina made her season debut at the 2020 CS Nebelhorn Trophy, where she placed thirteenth. She was on the preliminary entry list for the 2020 CS Budapest Trophy but withdrew.  After winning her second consecutive national title, she competed at the 2021 Tallink Hotels Cup, taking the silver medal behind Eva-Lotta Kiibus. 

Mikutina made her World debut in Stockholm at the 2021 World Championships in late March. She skated clean in her short program at the event to score a new personal best, topping her previous score by over 14 points and qualified to the free skate in eleventh place. She then placed seventh in the free skate and finished eighth overall. Mikutina's placement in the top ten qualified a place for Austria at the 2022 Winter Olympics, as well as the possibility of a second berth and two placements at the following year's world championships. It was the best result for an Austrian lady since Julia Lautowa's eighth place in 1997.

2021–2022 season
Suffering from right knee inflammation, Mikutina's training was hindered over the summer, and as a result, she withdrew from the 2021 CS Denis Ten Memorial Challenge and what was to be her first Grand Prix assignment, the 2021 NHK Trophy. She made her Grand Prix debut at the 2021 Rostelecom Cup, where she finished in twelfth place of twelve skaters.

Mikutina failed to defend her national title, taking the silver medal behind Stefanie Pesendorfer, but was still assigned to the Austrian Olympic team and the European Championships, finishing fifteenth at the latter in January. Competing at the 2022 Winter Olympics in the women's event, Mikutina placed eighteenth in the short program. Fourteenth in the free skate, she rose to fourteenth overall.

Days after the Olympics concluded, Vladimir Putin ordered an invasion of Ukraine, as a result of which the International Skating Union banned all Russian and Belarusian skaters from competing at the 2022 World Championships. Mikutina's birthplace of Kharkiv became the site of one of the largest and most destructive battles of the war, which she vocally protested. She placed fourteen at the World Championships.

2022–2023 season
Mikutina continued to train, noting that "when I go on the ice, I can imagine myself in another world," away from worries relating to the war, while her father and grandparents continued to live in eastern Ukraine. She started her season with seventh and ninth placements at the 2022 CS Nebelhorn Trophy and 2022 CS Finlandia Trophy, respectively. She then went on to win gold at the 2022 Tayside Trophy. At the 2022 Grand Prix de France, Mikutina finished in tenth place after placing tenth in both the short and free programs. She was tenth as well at the 2022 NHK Trophy.

Programs

Competitive highlights 
GP: Grand Prix; CS: Challenger Series; JGP: Junior Grand Prix

Detailed results 
Small medals for short and free programs awarded only at ISU Championships.

Senior results

Junior results

References

External links 

 

2003 births
Living people
Sportspeople from Kharkiv
People from Feldkirch, Vorarlberg
Sportspeople from Vorarlberg
Austrian female single skaters
Ukrainian female single skaters
Ukrainian emigrants to Austria
Figure skaters at the 2022 Winter Olympics
Olympic figure skaters of Austria